Middleton Grange School (abbreviated MGS) in Christchurch, New Zealand, is a state-integrated Christian co-educational Year 1 to 13 school. It's currently New Zealand's largest evangelical Christian school.

History
Established in 1964 by the Christian Schools Trust, as an independent Christian school and became integrated into the state system in 1996.

Middleton Grange School belongs to the Christchurch Christian Schools Network (CSN) and the New Zealand Association for Christian Schools (NZACS).

The school premises used to house the Christchurch headquarters of the Maxim Institute, a conservative Christian thinktank. Bruce Logan was once Middleton Grange's former curriculum director.

In 2010, the school was ordered to apologise and compensate a former employee for firing him because of his homosexuality.

In 2018, the school held a mufti day for a gold coin donation called 'dress as refugees' to support World Vision. The school asked students to dress as refuges in old ragged cloths. The former principal Richard Vanderpyl said that the mufti say was a good way to develop understanding and compassion is to experience a little bit of what it feels like to be poor. The school received two complaints from parents due to the mufti day.

Structure 
Middleton Grange School's academic structure consists of four departments, Primary School, Middle School, Senior College and International College.

Primary School consists of students from years 1-6, Middle School consists of students from years 7-10 and Senior College consists of students from years 11-13

Primary School, Middle School and Senior College all have separate heads.  The Head of Primary School is Rod Thompson,  the Head of Middle School is Mike Barlow, and the Head of Senior College is Ruth Velluppillai.

Years 7-13 all have Deans or Learning Team Leaders for each year. The current principal is Mike Vannoort.

Academics 
As a state-integrated school, Middleton Grange follows the New Zealand Curriculum (NZC). In Years 11 to 13, students complete the National Certificate of Educational Achievement (NCEA), the main secondary school qualification in New Zealand

Attendance

Primary School 
Each year group in the primary school approximately 48 pupils

Middle School (Year 7 - 10) 
Each year group has on average 124 pupils

Senior College (Year 11 - 13) 
Each year group has 197 pupils on average

In total, the school has 1346 pupils

Houses
Pupils and teachers are divided into specific houses which then compete in (mostly) sporting and cultural activities. There are four of these, named after early British explorers of Antarctica, as Robert Falcon Scott stayed at Middleton Grange's original gentry house before embarking on his ill-fated expedition.

Notable alumni
Graham Capill - Former leader, Christian Heritage, later convicted of pedophilic sexual offences. Eldest son of Don Capill, First Middleton Grange Vice-Principal.
Jeremy Kench - Professional basketball player
Richie Edwards - Professional basketball player
Olivia Podmore - Professional racing cyclist
William Stedman - 2x bronze medal Paralympian
Em-Haley Walker - Singer
Josiah Tualamali’i - Health and social justice advocate

Notable staff
Vic Pollard (Former Associate Principal)
Bruce Logan (Former Curriculum Director)

References

External links
Education Review Office (ERO) reports

Primary schools in Christchurch
Intermediate schools in New Zealand
Secondary schools in Christchurch
Educational institutions established in 1964
Christian schools in New Zealand
1964 establishments in New Zealand